The children's television series Kids Incorporated produced a total of 151 episodes between 1984 and 1994.

Series overview
Note: The airdates are guessed. The real airdates are unknown.

Pilot (1983)

Episodes

Season 1 (1984–1985)
The first season aired in syndication from 1984 to 1985, and this is the only season to feature Jerry Sharell. He left "Kids Incorporated" after Season 1 due to being unhappy with the show’s often bizarre and outlandish story lines. 

Cast
Stacy Ferguson 
Marta Marrero
Rahsaan Patterson 
Renee Sands 
Jerry Sharell 
Moosie Drier 

Dancers
Wendy Brainard
Aaron Hamilton
Mario Lopez
Carletta Price (episodes 14-26)
Shanice Wilson (episodes 1-13)
Andrea Paige Wilson

Episodes

Season 2 (1985–1986) 
Like the first season, the second season aired in syndication from 1985 to 1986. Jerry Sherrell left the show, to be replaced by Ryan Lambert. This would be the final season of the syndication era.

Cast
Stacy Ferguson
Ryan Lambert 
Martika Marrero
Rahsaan Patterson
Renee Sands 
Moosie Drier 

Dancers
Chad Anderson (uncredited)
Wendy Brainard
Darren Lee
Mario Lopez
Gina Marie Vinaccia
Andrea Paige Wilson

Episodes

Season 3 (1986) 
The third season premiered on the Disney Channel on November 3, 1986. All of the cast from the previous season returned. Episodes would be aired on weekdays rather than Saturdays. 13 episodes aired in less than a month between November 3 and November 19, 1986 with a New Years' Eve special airing the following month. This was also Martika Marrero and Mario Lopez’s last season on "Kids Incorporated".

Cast
Stacy Ferguson
Ryan Lambert
Martika Marrero
Rahsaan Patterson
Renee Sands
Moosie Drier

Dancers

Wendy Brainard

Darren Lee
Mario Lopez
Gina Marie Vinaccia
Andrea Paige Wilson

Episodes

Season 4 (1987) 
Martika left the show prior to the fourth season, to pursue her new career in music. She was replaced by Connie Lew. Mario Lopez left "Kids Incorporated" after Season 3 ended to star on Saved by the Bell. Richard Shoff replaced Mario Lopez as the group's new drummer. And unlike his predecessor, Richard was made one of the main cast, expanding the group from five to six members. This was the final season for Renee Sands and Rashaan Patterson. 

Cast
Stacey Ferguson
Ryan Lambert 
Connie Lew 
Rahsaan Patterson
Renee Sands 
Richard Shoff 
Moosie Drier

Dancers
Dee Caspary
Nicole Cropper
Angella Kaye
Challyn Markray
Brian Poth
Gina Marie Vinaccia

Season 5 (1988) 
Rahsaan Patterson and Renee Sands left the show prior to the fifth season, leaving Stacy Ferguson as the last remaining original band member. Added to the cast this season were Kenny Ford and Devyn Puett replacing Rahsaan Patterson and Renee Sands. This was the final season to feature Ryan Lambert, Connie Lew, and Moosie Drier. 

Cast
Stacy Ferguson 
Kenny Ford
Ryan Lambert
Connie Lew 
Devyn Puett 
Richard Shoff 
Moosie Drier 

'
Dancers
Dee Caspary
Nicole Cropper
Kimberly Duncan
Brian Poth
Gina Marie Vinaccia

Season 6 (1989–1990) 
Ryan Lambert, Connie Lew, and Moosie Drier departed the cast and were replaced by Jennifer Love Hewitt (then know as Love Hewitt) and Sean O'Riordan as The P*lace's new owner (named Flip). This is the final season to feature Stacy Ferguson, Devyn Puett, and Richard Shoff. The group was contact back down to five members since season 3. For this season, and this season only, episodes would not be broadcast on Fridays. Instead, episodes would air Monday through Thursday only, with new episodes airing on Monday, and reruns of older episodes airing on Tuesdays, Wednesdays and Thursdays.

Cast
Stacy Ferguson 
Kenny Ford
Love Hewitt
Devyn Puett 
Richard Shoff
Sean O'Riordan 

Dancers
Joseph Conrad
Kimberly Duncan
Leilani Lagmay
Angella Kaye
Tiffany Robbins
Cory Tyler

Episodes

Season 7 (1991) 
The series resumed production after a year hiatus in 1990, but many of the cast members Richard Shoff, Devyn Puett, and the only remaining original cast member Stacy Ferguson had already moved onto other projects. However, Kenny Ford, Love Hewitt, and Sean O'Riordan all returned. New additions to the cast this season were Eric Balfour, Anastasia Horne, and Haylie Johnson. This was Love Hewitt's final season on "Kids Incorporated" and the only season to feature Eric Balfour. The series would return to its original Monday through Friday line-up. Season 7 made its official debut on November 4, 1991 and ended on November 29, 1991.

Cast
Eric Balfour
Kenny Ford
Love Hewitt
Anastasia Horne
Haylie Johnson
Sean O'Riordan 

Dancers
Charon Aldredge
Brian Friedman
Jennifer King
Danielle Marcus-Janssen
Anthony "Tony" Perrin
Angella Kaye

Season 8 (1992) 
Most of the cast from the previous season returned, with the exception of Jennifer Love Hewitt and Eric Balfour. Added to the cast in the 8th season were Jared Delgin  and Nicole Brown. This would be the final season for Kenny Ford and Sean O'Riordan and this was also the only season to feature Jared Delgin.

Cast
Nicole Brown
Jared Delgin
Kenny Ford
Anastasia Horne 
Haylie Johnson
Sean O'Riordan 

Dancers
Charon Aldredge
Brian Friedman
Jennifer King
Danielle Marcus-Janssen
Tony Perrin

Season 9 (1993–1994) 
Kenny Ford, Sean O'Riordan, and Jared Delgin did not return for this season. Added to the cast were Charlie Brady and Anthony Harrell. With Flip gone, "The P*lace" was now managed by a new character, Dena (played by Dena Burton).

During this season, several changes were made in an attempt to freshen up the series; including a change in the logo, cutting the number of songs featured from seasons 1–8, and an updated, more rock-based closing theme. Also, this season marked the only time that adult characters other than the P*lace manager  were given significance in the plots.  Also, as part of massive set changes, the "Coco Club" was replaced by a pizza parlor.

Budget cuts and the expiration of Disney's lease with MGM prompted another hiatus in 1993, after only ten episodes of Season 9 had been filmed. The last episode of this season, which aired on February 9, 1994, proved to be the series finale. By the summer of 1995, when the show was scheduled to resume production, most of the cast members had gotten too old to sustain the Kids Incorporated image. Thus, the show did not continue.
 
The format of the show would have changed, giving the songs less importance and placing them in breaks in the main storyline action. and Some proposed scripts had no songs at all. In addition, the show's filming would have moved from Los Angeles to Canada. and there was some hype created for the new Kids Incorporated project in Los Angeles and New York, but it never came to fruition.
 
After its default cancellation, the show continued to be shown in reruns on the Disney Channel until May 30, 1996.

Cast
Charlie Brady
Nicole Brown  
Anthony Harrell 
Anastasia Horne 
Haylie Johnson
Dena Burton

Dancers
Charon Aldredge
Ken Arata
Brian Friedman
Andre Fuentes
Danielle Marcus-Janssen

Notes

1.An original song composed specifically for the show, not to be confused with the Burt Bacharach and Carole Bayer Sager song of the same name.

Kids Incorporated